Stephan Rabitsch (born 28 June 1991) is an Austrian racing cyclist, who currently rides for UCI Continental team . He rode at the 2013 UCI Road World Championships.

Major results

2008
 1st  Time trial, National Junior Road Championships
2009
 1st  Time trial, National Junior Road Championships
2011
 1st Stage 1 Sibiu Cycling Tour
2012
 1st Stage 1 (TTT) Tour of Szeklerland
2013
 5th Ruota d'Oro
2014
 5th Croatia–Slovenia
2015
 2nd Overall Giro del Friuli-Venezia Giulia
2016
 1st  Overall Oberösterreich Rundfahrt
 8th Overall Okolo Slovenska
1st Stage 4
 10th Overall Circuit des Ardennes International
 10th G.P. Costa degli Etruschi
 10th GP Kranj
2017
 1st  Overall Oberösterreich Rundfahrt
1st Stage 1
 3rd GP Laguna
 5th Overall Flèche du Sud
1st  Mountains classification
 6th Overall Istrian Spring Trophy
 7th GP Izola
 8th Overall Tour de Savoie Mont-Blanc
2018
 1st  Overall Rhône-Alpes Isère Tour
1st Stage 3
 1st  Overall Paris–Arras Tour
1st Stage 2
 1st  Overall Oberösterreich Rundfahrt
1st Stages 1 & 3
 2nd Overall Flèche du Sud
 5th Raiffeisen Grand Prix
 9th Overall Istrian Spring Trophy
2019
 2nd Overall Oberösterreich Rundfahrt
 9th Overall Tour of Antalya
 10th Raiffeisen Grand Prix

References

External links

 
 
 

1991 births
Living people
Austrian male cyclists
Sportspeople from Klagenfurt
21st-century Austrian people